Romania competed at the 1972 Summer Olympics in Munich, West Germany. 159 competitors, 132 men and 27 women, took part in 102 events in 16 sports.

Medalists

|  style="text-align:left; width:72%; vertical-align:top;"|

| style="text-align:left; width:23%; vertical-align:top;"|

Athletics

Men's 800 metres
Gheorghe Ghipu
 Heat — 1:50.1 (→ did not advance)

Men's 1500 metres
Petre Lupan
 Heat — 3:44.8 (→ did not advance)

Men's High Jump
Șerban Ioan 
 Qualifying Round — 2.15m
 Final — 2.10m (→ 16th place)

Women's Discus Throw
Carmen Ionescu
 Qualifying Round — 57.82 m
 Final — 60.42 m (→ 7th place)

Women's Javelin Throw
 Éva Ráduly-Zörgő
 Qualification — 54.34 m
 Final — no mark (→ no ranking)

Boxing

Men's Light Flyweight (– 48 kg)
Alexandru Turei 
 First Round — Lost to Enrique Rodríguez (ESP), 2:3

Men's Light Middleweight (– 71 kg)
Ion Györfi
 First Round — Bye 
 Second Round — Lost to Peter Tiepold (GDR), 1:4

Men's Heavyweight (+ 81 kg)
Ion Alexe →  Silver Medal
 First Round — Defeated Jozsef Reder (HUN), 5:0 
 Quarterfinals — Defeated Jürgen Fanghänel (GDR), 5:0 
 Semifinals — Defeated Hasse Thomsén (SWE), 5:0 
 Final — Lost to Teófilo Stevenson (CUB), walk-over

Canoeing

Cycling

One cyclist represented Romania in 1972.

Individual road race
 Teodor Vasile — 60th place

Diving

Men's 3m Springboard:
 Ion Ganea — 325.17 points (→ 21st place)

Men's 10m Platform:
 Ion Ganea — 265.83 points (→ 25th place)

Women's 3m Springboard:
 Sorana Prelipceanu — 242.61 points (→ 21st place)
 Melania Decuseara — 232.02 points (→ 27th place)

Women's 10m Platform:
 Melania Decuseara — 182.82 points (→ 16th place)

Fencing

19 fencers, 15 men and 4 women, represented Romania in 1972.

Men's foil
 Mihai Țiu
 Ștefan Haukler
 Tănase Mureșanu

Men's team foil
 Iuliu Falb, Ștefan Haukler, Mihai Țiu, Tănase Mureșanu, Aurel Ștefan

Men's épée
 Anton Pongratz
 Alexandru Istrate
 Costică Bărăgan

Men's team épée
 Constantin Duțu, Costică Bărăgan, Anton Pongratz, Alexandru Istrate, Nicolae Iorgu

Men's sabre
 Iosif Budahazi
 Dan Irimiciuc
 Constantin Nicolae

Men's team sabre
 Dan Irimiciuc, Iosif Budahazi, Gheorghe Culcea, Constantin Nicolae, Octavian Vintilă

Women's foil
 Ileana Gyulai-Drîmbă-Jenei
 Olga Orban-Szabo
 Ana Derșidan-Ene-Pascu

Women's team foil
 Ecaterina Stahl-Iencic, Ileana Gyulai-Drîmbă-Jenei, Olga Orban-Szabo, Ana Derșidan-Ene-Pascu

Gymnastics

Handball

Men's Team Competition
Preliminary Round Group C
  Defeated Norway (18-14)
  Defeated Spain (15-12)
  Defeated West Germany (13-11)
Main Round Group II
  Defeated Hungary (20-14)
  Lost to Yugoslavia (13-14)
Final Round, Bronze Medal Match
  Defeated East Germany (19-16)
 Romania -  Bronze Medal (5-1-0)
Team Roster
Cornel Penu
Alexandru Dincă
Gabriel Kicsid
Ghiţă Licu
Cristian Gațu
Roland Gunesch
Radu Voina
Simion Schöbel
Gheorghe Gruia
Werner Stöckl
Marin Dan
Adrian Cosma
Valentin Samungi
Constantin Tudosie
Ştefan Birtalan

Modern pentathlon

Three male pentathletes represented Romania in 1972.

Men's Individual Competition:
 Dumitru Spîrlea - 4754 pts (→ 23rd place)
 Marian Cosmescu - 4890 (→ 38th place)
 Adalbert Covacs - 4381 points (→ 48th place)

Men's Team Competition:
 Spirlea, Cosmescu, and Covacs - 13655 points (→ 12th place)

Rowing

Men's Coxed Pairs
Stefan Tudor, Petre Ceapura and Ladislau Lovrenschi
Heat — 7:47.98
Repechage — 8:08.34
Semi Finals — 8:10.89
Final — 7:21.36 (→  Bronze Medal)

Shooting

Ten male shooters represented Romania in 1972. Daniel Iuga won silver in the 50 m pistol and Nicolae Rotaru won bronze in the 50 m rifle, prone event.

25 m pistol
 Daniel Iuga
 Ion Tripșa

50 m pistol
 Daniel Iuga

300 m rifle, three positions
 Petre Șandor
 Eugen Satală

50 m rifle, three positions
 Nicolae Rotaru
 Petre Șandor

50 m rifle, prone
 Nicolae Rotaru
 Ilie Codreanu

Trap
 Gheorghe Florescu
 Ion Dumitrescu

Skeet
 Lucian Cojocaru
 Gleb Pintilie

Swimming

Men's 100m Freestyle
Marian Slavic
 Heat — 55.35s (→  did not advance)

Men's 200m Freestyle
Marian Slavic
 Heat — 2:00.23 (→  did not advance)

Volleyball

Men's Team Competition
Preliminary Round (Group B)
  Lost to Japan 0-3 (4, 5, 6)
  Defeated West Germany 3-0 (9,1,8)
  Lost to Brazil 2-3 (-16,11,-7,11,-12)
  Defeated Cuba 3-0 (7,15,13)
  Lost to East Germany 0-3 (-10,-12,-7)

Final Round (places 5-8)
  Defeated South Korea 3-0 (12, 7, 8)
  Defeated Czechoslovakia 3-1 (-8, 7, 10,14) →5th place

 Team Roster

  Gabriel Udişteanu
  Gyula Bartha
  Cornel Oros
  Laurențiu Dumănoiu
  William Schreiber
  Cristian Ion
  Marian Stamate
  Mircea Codoi
  Romeo Enescu
  Stelian Moculescu
  Viorel Bălaj

Water polo

Men's Team Competition
Preliminary Round (Group A)
 Lost to United States (3-4)
 Lost to Yugoslavia (7-8)
 Lost to Cuba (3-4)
 Defeated Canada (16-4)
 Defeated Mexico (9-6)
Final Round (Group II)
 Defeated Spain (7-4)
 Defeated Bulgaria (4-3)
 Drew with the Netherlands (5-5)
 Defeated Australia (5-3) → 8th place

 Team Roster
 Iosif Culiniak
 Corneliu Fratila
 Serban Huber
 Radu Lazar
 Bogdan Mihailescu
 Gruia Novae
 Dinu Popescu
 Viorel Rus
 Claudiu Rusu
 Cornel Rusu
 Gheorghe Zamfirescu

Weightlifting

Wrestling

References

Nations at the 1972 Summer Olympics
1972 Summer Olympics
1972 in Romanian sport